Thomas Dewey Wise (born August 30, 1939) is a former American politician in the state of South Carolina. He served in the South Carolina Senate as a member of the Democratic Party from 1972 to 1984, representing Charleston County, South Carolina. He is a lawyer.

References

1939 births
Living people
Democratic Party members of the South Carolina House of Representatives
Democratic Party South Carolina state senators